The Federation of Construction and Services (Hábitat) is a trade union representing workers in the construction and personal services sectors in Spain.

The union was established in 2014, when the Federation of Private Services merged with the Federation of Construction, Wood and Related Industries.  Like both its predecessors, it affiliated to the Workers' Commissions.  Jesús Ángel Belvis was elected as its first general secretary.

References

External links

Building and construction trade unions
Trade unions established in 2014
Trade unions in Spain